Annika Horbach (born 18 January 1994) is a German female badminton player.

Achievements

BWF International Challenge/Series

Women's Doubles

Mixed Doubles

 BWF International Challenge tournament
 BWF International Series tournament
 BWF Future Series tournament

References

External links 

1994 births
Living people
German female badminton players